, better known by her stage name Chara, is a Japanese singer, actress and video jockey. She debuted in 1991 with the single Heaven. She is known for her song "Swallowtail Butterfly (Ai no Uta)", the theme song for the 1996 Shunji Iwai film Swallowtail Butterfly in which she starred, her 1997 hit single "Yasashii Kimochi", and her collaboration with Judy and Mary vocalist Yuki, "Ai no Hi Mittsu Orange". Chara later formed a band with Yuki, called Mean Machine.

Early life
Chara grew up in Kawaguchi, Saitama. She started learning the piano from age four, and starting composing songs in elementary school. In her first year of elementary school, she performed a song she had written, at a school piano recital.

She originally received her nickname Chara in junior high school, after a teacher called her this. She was so well known by this name that even some of her friends did not know her real name. She continues to use this name as she believes it brings out her inner child. After finishing high school, Chara went to Tokyo to a vocational school, majoring in music and specialising in piano. However, she dropped out one year into her two-year degree.

From 1984 onward, she worked as a keyboardist in several different unsigned bands. During this time, she found part-time work as a roller-skating waitress. In 1988, to get a chance to sing her own compositions, she decided to become a band vocalist instead. Her first live performance was at the Shinjuku Ruido live house in 1990.

Career

1991–1995: Early releases
Chara sent a demo tape to Sony Music in 1990, which caught the attention of Masahiro Ohara and landed her a deal with Epic Records Japan She recorded her debut album in early 1991 in Tokyo and London, and debuted in September with a performance at the Shibuya Club Quattro and the release of her debut single Heaven. In October, Chara became a personality on the ANN music show Video Jam, and later in November released her debut album Sweet. The album was not very successful, only reaching No. 64 on Oricon's album charts.

Chara's career gained more momentum after her first tour, Chara Live "Sweet" in May 1992. She became a radio personality for the FM Yokohama, with her own radio show , and her second album, Soul Kiss, won the 1992 Japan Record Award for best rock/pop album from a new artist. The album reached No. 14 on the album charts.

In 1993, she starred in many different commercials (or had her songs featured in them), including commercials for Suntory, Shiseido, Marui and Snow Brand ice creams. Her single , the song used in the Shiseido campaign, was her first top 100 charting single, reaching No. 66. The resulting album, Violet Blue, debuted at No. 4 on the charts. Her 1994 album, Happy Toy, riding on the success of her first top 50 single , also debuting at No. 4.

In spring 1994, she filmed the Shunji Iwai film Picnic, in which she played a mental patient. The film would not be released for another two years. She starred aside Tadanobu Asano, whom she married in 1995. Chara took a short break from music, releasing Chara the Best Baby Baby Baby XXX and giving birth to her first child, a girl named .Sumire means violet.

1996–2001: Mainstream success
In February 1996, Chara began filming her second film for Iwai, titled Swallowtail Butterfly. She played , a slum prostitute with musical aspirations. Chara recorded the soundtrack for the movie, collaborating with Mr. Children music producer Takeshi Kobayashi to create a Beatles-esque sound. The music was released under the name Yen Town Band, the name of the band Glico forms in the film.

Before the movie's release, the theme song "Swallowtail Butterfly (Ai no Uta)" was released, along with Chara's first film with Iwai, Picnic, finding a proper cinema release. The film was a massive hit, propelling Chara to stardom. Both the concept album, Montage, and the theme song reached No. 1 on Oricon charts. Her performance awarded her a Japan Academy Prize for Outstanding Performance by an Actress in a Leading Role nomination. The film won the Most Popular Film award.

Chara's fame soared, as shown by her next album Junior Sweet. The main single from the album, "Yasashii Kimochi" (the Shiseido 'Tessera J' CM song), was a big hit, selling over 520,000 copies and became her second biggest hit after Swallowtail Butterfly (Ai no Uta). The album was certified by the RIAJ as selling over 1,000,000 copies.

Her 1999 album, Strange Fruits, saw some success, debuting at No. 3 and selling over 300,000 copies. Chara teamed up with Judy and Mary vocalist Yuki to release a special single called "Ai no Hi Mittsu Orange". This song is Chara's third biggest hit, selling over 230,000 copies.

In 2000, Chara released her second best-of collection, Caramel Milk: The Best of Chara, and 2001 released her 8th album, Madrigal. Madrigal featured two tracks co-written with American guitarist James Iha.

2001–2005: Mean Machine
In late 2001, Chara released music as the drummer of the twin-drum all-girl rock band, Mean Machine, alongside Yuki, Swallowtail actress Ayumi Ito, 1980s musician Mayumi Chiwaki and former funk/rock band Jagatara dancer Yukarie. The band was conceived in 1998, when Chiwaki mentioned to Chara that she thought it would be good to start up a girls' rock band. One of the tenets of the band was that all members would have to do something they'd never tried before, landing Chara on drums. The band first practiced in 1999, and continued to sporadically practice throughout 2000, despite different members' schedules.

In 2001, the band debuted with the song , which was written by Chara during her second pregnancy, inspired by the breathing sounds of the Lamaze technique. Soon after, the band released their debut album Cream.

In 2003, Chara released her 9th solo album, Yoake Mae, and in 2004 released an album of re-recordings of songs from her early albums, A Scenery Like Me. This heralded the end of Chara's Sony contract. Chara self-released her music after this point, recording songs from her own home and self-producing her work. These recordings resulted in a limited 2,000 copy album, Something Blue, and a digital single  (used as the theme song for the Japanese release of the movie March of the Penguins).

During this period, Chara created several bands. One, Cold Sugar was a collaboration with Arai Akino.

2006–present 

Chara re-debuted as a major label artist in 2006, with the release of the single "Sekai". Her single "Fantasy" was a minor hit, reaching No. 13 on Oricon charts. It was written in collaboration with Seiji Kameda, producer for artists such as Do As Infinity and bassist for the band Tokyo Jihen. The following album, Union, also fared well. It reached the top 5 in Oricon's album charts, and outsold her former two Sony released albums. On the back of Chara's returned success, Sony released the compilation album, Sugar Hunter: The Best Love Songs of Chara.

Chara's Universal singles have fared better on digital charts. "Trophy", a single from Chara's second Universal album Honey, did well digitally, despite the physical release only reaching No. 37.

After the end of her contract with Universal, Chara released a new mini-album, Utakata, on November 2011 under BounDEE Inc. (a subsidiary of Space Shower Networks, the owners of Space Shower TV). Utakata charted at 56th spot on the Oricon charts and lasted there for three weeks.

On December 14, 2011, Chara announced in a concert at Shibuya-AX her transfer to Ki/oon Records (now Ki/oon Music), an imprint of Sony Music Japan. She joined Ki/oon's 20th anniversary concert tour, "Ki/oon 20 Years and Days", in April 2012 at Liquidroom Ebisu, Tokyo. She released her first single through Ki/oon, "Alterna Girlfriend", on June 6, 2012.

Chara collaborated with Basement Jaxx for the song "Wherever You Go" on the album Junto in 2014.

Personal life
In 1994, Chara married actor Tadanobu Asano. She met Asano on the set of the 1994 film Picnic, in which they were both starring actors. Chara gave birth to a daughter, on July 4, 1995. Chara also had a son  with Asano on December 19, 1998. The couple attended the 80th Academy Awards in Los Angeles in 2008, as the film Mongol, in which Asano starred, was nominated for the best foreign film category as the submission from Kazakhstan. On July 25, 2009, Chara announced her amicable divorce from Asano, after fourteen years of marriage. Chara's children feature in her music. Sumire features on the cover of her album Honey, which also has a track named after her.

Discography

Sweet (1991)
Soul Kiss (1992)
Violet Blue (1993)
Happy Toy (1994)
Montage (1996)
Junior Sweet (1997)
Strange Fruits (1999)
Madrigal (2001)
Yoake Mae (2003)
A Scenery Like Me (2004)
Something Blue (2005)
Union (2007)
Honey (2008)
Carol (2009)
Dark Candy (2011)
Cocoon (2012)
Jewel (2013)
Secret Garden (2015)
Diverse Journey (2016)
Sympathy (2017)
Baby Bump (2018)

Filmography

Films

Series

TV music shows

References

External links
  
 Official Universal Music Label Site 
 Ongaku Bāka Official Website 
 

1968 births
Living people
People from Kawaguchi, Saitama
Actors from Saitama Prefecture
Japanese film actresses
Japanese women pop singers
Japanese songwriters
Japanese television personalities
Japanese radio personalities
Japanese women rock singers
Mean Machine (band) members
20th-century Japanese actresses
A&M Records artists
Epic Records artists
VJs (media personalities)
Musicians from Saitama Prefecture
20th-century Japanese women singers
20th-century Japanese singers
21st-century Japanese women singers
21st-century Japanese singers
Ki/oon Music artists
Universal Music Japan artists
Trip hop musicians
Downtempo musicians